Markus Haverinen (born September 24, 1983) is a Finnish former professional ice hockey forward.

Haverinen began his career with Kärpät, playing four years in their junior teams but never managed to play for the senior side. After being released in 2004, he joined Hokki of the second-tier Mestis and went on to play a total of 202 games for the team over two separate spells.

In 2010, Haverinen moved to Sweden and signed for Kiruna IF of Hockeyettan and stayed for two seasons before retiring.

References

External links

1983 births
Living people
Finnish ice hockey forwards
Hokki players
Iisalmen Peli-Karhut players
People from Kajaani
Sportspeople from Kainuu